Peki'in HaHadasha (lit. New Peki'in) is a moshav in northern Israel. Located near Peki'in, it falls under the jurisdiction of Ma'ale Yosef Regional Council.

History
The moshav was established in 1955 by two gar'ins of Jewish immigrants from Morocco at the initiative of President Yitzhak Ben-Zvi. The first group arrived in February, and was made up of former residents of Casablanca, Fes, Melilla and Rabat. The second group arrived in October, and was composed of immigrants from Larache, Tangier and Tétouan.

References

Moshavim
Populated places established in 1955
Populated places in Northern District (Israel)
1955 establishments in Israel
Moroccan-Jewish culture in Israel